Bessie Mae Kelley (fl. 1920s) was an early American animator. Her work is believed to be the earliest surviving hand-drawn animation drawn and directed by a woman.

Kelley began her career in animation late in 1917, working her way up through the ranks, cleaning cels and assistant animating, before quickly animating at Bray Studios. She contributed animation to Fleischer Studios' Koko the Clown series and others, before directing and animating short films. These included Gasoline Alley (1920) and Flower Fairies (1921) and A Merry Christmas (1922) in Chicago. She also contributed character designs and animations to Paul Terry's "Aesop’s Fables" series. She collaborated with Terry in drawing a mouse couple named Milton and Mary, which predated the creation of Mickey and Minnie Mouse.

Kelley's work remained largely unknown until her collection was rediscovered and two of her films were restored by animation historian Mindy Johnson in 2022. Johnson discovered Kelley in a series of images of male animators from the early 1920s. Other historians had previously assumed her to be a secretary or cleaning woman.

References 

American women animators
American animators
Year of birth missing
Year of death missing